LIRC (Linux Infrared remote control) is an open source package that allows users to receive and send infrared signals with a Linux-based computer system.

There is a Microsoft Windows equivalent of LIRC called WinLIRC.

With LIRC and an IR receiver the user can control their computer with almost any infrared remote control (e.g. a TV remote control). The user may for instance control DVD or music playback with their remote control.

One GUI frontend is KDELirc, built on the KDE libraries.

See also
 RC-5

External links
LIRC - Linux Infrared Remote Control
SourceForge.net: Linux Infrared Remote Control
WinLIRC Homepage
KDELirc Homepage

Free software programmed in C
Software related to embedded Linux
Infrared technology